Idiocera is a genus of crane fly in the family Limoniidae.

Species
Subgenus Euptilostena Alexander, 1938
I. arabiensis Hancock, 1997
I. dampfiana (Alexander, 1938)
I. jucunda (Loew, 1873)
I. knowltoniana (Alexander, 1948)
I. moghalica (Alexander, 1961)
I. multipunctata Savchenko, 1982
I. paulsi Stary and Ujvarosi, 2005
I. polingi (Alexander, 1946)
I. reticulata (Alexander, 1922)
I. supernumeraria (Alexander, 1938)
Subgenus Idiocera Dale, 1842

I. abjecta (Alexander, 1933)
I. absona (Alexander, 1956)
I. acaenophallos (Alexander, 1968)
I. accincta (Alexander, 1957)
I. acifurca (Alexander, 1955)
I. afghanica (Nielsen, 1963)
I. aldabrensis (Edwards, 1912)
I. alexanderiana (Lackschewitz, 1940)
I. ampullifera (Stary, 1979)
I. angustissima (Alexander, 1928)
I. antilopina Stary, 1982
I. apicispina (Alexander, 1926)
I. arete (Alexander, 1958)
I. biacus (Alexander, 1948)
I. bidens Savchenko, 1979
I. bipilata (Alexander, 1957)
I. bistylata (Alexander, 1958)
I. blanda (Osten Sacken, 1860)
I. bradleyi (Edwards, 1939)
I. brookmani (Alexander, 1944)
I. buettikeri Hancock, 1997
I. californica (Alexander, 1916)
I. cockerelli (Alexander, 1929)
I. coheriana (Alexander, 1959)
I. collessi Theischinger, 1994
I. coloradica (Alexander, 1920)
I. conchiformis (Alexander, 1958)
I. connexa (Loew, 1873)
I. contracta (Alexander, 1960)
I. cotabatoensis (Alexander, 1934)
I. curticellula (Alexander, 1930)
I. curticurva (Alexander, 1975)
I. daedalus (Alexander, 1956)
I. displosa (Alexander, 1957)
I. flintiana (Alexander, 1961)
I. furcosa (Alexander, 1968)
I. gaigei (Rogers, 1931)
I. glabriapicalis (Alexander, 1948)
I. gorokana (Alexander, 1973)
I. gothicana (Alexander, 1943)
I. gunvorae (Alexander, 1964)
I. hainanensis (Alexander, 1936)
I. hasta Stary, 1982
I. heteroclada (Alexander, 1966)
I. hofufensis Hancock, 1997
I. hoogstraali (Alexander, 1946)
I. impavida (Alexander, 1948)
I. insidiosa (Alexander, 1938)
I. involuta (Alexander, 1961)
I. kashongensis (Alexander, 1968)
I. kowalskii Stary and Krzeminski, 1984
I. kuwayamai (Alexander, 1926)
I. lackschewitzi (Stary, 1977)
I. lamia (Alexander, 1968)
I. lanciformis Hancock, 1997
I. laterospina (Alexander, 1975)
I. leda (Alexander, 1968)
I. leechi (Alexander, 1964)
I. lindseyi (Alexander, 1946)
I. lobatostylata Hancock, 1997
I. longipennis (Alexander, 1935)
I. lordosis (Alexander, 1960)
I. magra (Alexander, 1962)
I. maharaja (Alexander, 1961)
I. malagasica (Alexander, 1953)
I. mashonensis (Alexander, 1959)
I. mathesoni (Alexander, 1915)
I. megastigma (Alexander, 1970)
I. metatarsata (de Meijere, 1911)
I. multiarmata (Alexander, 1940)
I. multistylata (Alexander, 1948)
I. myriacantha (Alexander, 1957)
I. nigrilobata (Alexander, 1957)
I. nigroterminalis (Alexander, 1973)
I. octavia (Alexander, 1938)
I. octoapiculata (Savchenko, 1972)
I. omanensis Hancock, 1997
I. ornatula (Lackschewitz, 1964)
I. orthophallus (Alexander, 1975)
I. paleuma (Alexander, 1962)
I. pallens (Alexander, 1928)
I. peninsularis (Edwards, 1928)
I. pergracilis (Alexander, 1957)
I. perpallens (Alexander, 1938)
I. persimilis (Alexander, 1958)
I. persimplex (Alexander, 1969)
I. petilis (Alexander, 1958)
I. phaeosoma (Alexander, 1957)
I. phallostena (Alexander, 1957)
I. proserpina (Alexander, 1943)
I. proxima (Brunetti, 1912)
I. pruinosa (Alexander, 1920)
I. przewalskii (Lackschewitz, 1964)
I. pulchripennis (Loew, 1856)
I. punctata (Edwards, 1938)
I. punctipennis (Edwards, 1926)
I. recens (Alexander, 1950)
I. recurvinervis (Bergroth, 1913)
I. sachalinensis (Alexander, 1924)
I. sanaanensis Hancock, 2006
I. sarobiensis (Nielsen, 1961)
I. satanas (Alexander, 1959)
I. schrenkii (Mik, 1889)
I. sedata (Alexander, 1970)
I. serratistyla (Alexander, 1968)
I. serrulifera (Alexander, 1957)
I. sexdentata (Nielsen, 1963)
I. sexguttata (Dale, 1842)
I. shannoni (Alexander, 1926)
I. shantungensis (Alexander, 1930)
I. sita (Alexander, 1968)
I. sperryana (Alexander, 1948)
I. spinulistyla (Alexander, 1975)
I. spuria (Bergroth, 1888)
I. stenophallus (Alexander, 1958)
I. subpruinosa (Alexander, 1924)
I. subspuria (Alexander, 1948)
I. sziladyi (Lackschewitz, 1940)
I. teranishii (Alexander, 1921)
I. terribilis (Alexander, 1968)
I. thaiicola (Alexander, 1953)
I. theowaldi Savchenko, 1982
I. thomassetiana (Alexander, 1948)
I. tuckeri (Alexander, 1921)
I. vayu (Alexander, 1968)
I. xenopyga (Alexander, 1964)

References

Limoniidae
Nematocera genera
Diptera of North America
Diptera of Europe
Diptera of Asia